Analyse & Kritik: Journal of Philosophy and Social Theory is a hybrid open access biannual peer-reviewed academic journal published by De Gruyter Oldenbourg on behalf of the Institut für Sozialwissenschaften, Heinrich-Heine-Universität Düsseldorf, Germany, devoted to the fundamental issues of empirical and normative social theory. Publishing articles in English, this journal aims to promote the dialogue between Anglo-American and Continental traditions in the social sciences and ethics. This journal was established in 1979 and is abstracted and indexed by Scopus.

References

Academic journals published in Germany
De Gruyter academic journals
English-language journals
1979 establishments in West Germany
Publications established in 1979
Hybrid open access journals
Philosophy journals